Valentiner may refer to :

Herman Valentiner, Danish mathematician, who introduced the
Valentiner group in mathematics
Karl Wilhelm Valentiner, astronomer
Max Valentiner, U-boat captain
Wilhelm Valentiner, art historian

See also
 Valentine (disambiguation)